Edmund Borawski (born 17 April 1946 in Świdry Podleśne) is a Polish politician. He was elected to Sejm on 25 September 2005, getting 5311 votes in 24 Białystok district as a candidate from the Polish People's Party list.

He was also a member of Sejm 2001-2005.

See also
Members of Polish Sejm 2005-2007

External links
Edmund Borawski - parliamentary page - includes declarations of interest, voting record, and transcripts of speeches.

Members of the Polish Sejm 2005–2007
Members of the Polish Sejm 2001–2005
Polish People's Party politicians
1946 births
Living people
Members of the Polish Sejm 2011–2015
University of Warmia and Mazury in Olsztyn alumni
People from Kolno County